The Australian arm of the Daughters of Bilitis was formed in Melbourne in 1969, and is considered Australia's first gay rights group. It was inspired by the American Daughters of Bilitis movement. After a few months, the group rejected the increasing radicalisation of its American counterpart, and renamed itself the Australasian Lesbian Movement.

See also

LGBT rights in Australia
List of LGBT rights organisations
Coalition of Activist Lesbians Australia (COAL)

Further reading
Lucy Chesser, "Australasian Lesbian Movement, 'Claudia's Group' and Lynx: 'Non-Political Lesbian Organisation in Melbourne, 1969–1980", Hecate: An Interdisciplinary Journal of Women's Liberation, vol. 22, no. 1, 1996, pp. 69–91.

External links
Australian Queer Archives holds the records of the Daughters of Bilitis / Australasian Lesbian Movement.

Feminist organisations in Australia
LGBT political advocacy groups in Australia
LGBT history in Australia
Lesbian organisations based in Australia
1969 establishments in Australia
LGBT culture in Melbourne
Women in Melbourne